The Secretary for Education is a principal official in the Hong Kong Government, who heads the Education Bureau (EDB). The current office holder is Christine Choi.

History
The position of Secretary for Education and Manpower was set up in 1983 when the old Education Department was restructured into the Education and Manpower Branch and Education Department, and the old position of Director of Education was split into SEM and Director of Education accordingly, with the latter reporting to the former.

Since the Principal Officials Accountability System (POAS) was introduced in 2002, the SEM, as all other secretary positions, is an ex officio member of the Executive Council (ExCo). The position is a political appointment, and its term expires when the Chief Executive leaves office.

Before the introduction of the POAS in July 2002, the SEM, as well as all other secretary-level positions, was a civil service position. The office holder was not a member of the ExCo. Before 1991, the office holders may be appointed by the Governor as ex officio member of the Legislative Council.

At the same time when the POAS was introduced in 2002, the responsibility of labour issues was transferred to the Secretary for Economic Development and Labour, formerly Secretary for Economic Services.

According to the proposal tabled by Donald Tsang's administration after he was successfully re-elected as the Chief Executive, the manpower portfolio was transferred to the new Secretary for Labour and Welfare on 1 July 2007. The position of SEM was renamed Secretary for Education.

List of office holders
Political party:

Inspectors of Schools, 1862–1909

Directors of Education, 1909–1941

Directors of Education, 1946–1983

Secretaries for Education and Manpower, 1983–1997

Secretaries for Education and Manpower, 1997–2007

Secretaries for Education, 2007–present

See also
Hong Kong Government
Government departments and agencies in Hong Kong

References

External links
Official website of the EMB
Organisation chart of Hong Kong Government

Education, Secretary for
Education in Hong Kong
Hong Kong